François-Xavier Demaison may refer to:
 François-Xavier Demaison (actor)
 François-Xavier Demaison (engineer)